Cruce a Nado Internacional is a yearly international swimming competition that takes place at Bahía de Ponce in Ponce, Puerto Rico. It is the oldest open water swimming event in the Caribbean. The event generally occurs on the first Sunday of September, to coincide with the Sunday of Labor Day Weekend every year. The event is sponsored by Club Cruce a Nado, Inc. Some 100 athletes compete, swimming  nautical miles. The event started in 1980. The 2020 season's event did not take place due to the COVID-19 pandemic, but its 40th season took place on 5 September 2021 instead.

History 

The competition started in 1980 under the sponsorship of the Ponce Municipal Government.  It has gained popularity every year with a greater number of athletes participating from an equally greater number of countries. In 2008, 16 countries were represented. The competition abides by the rules of the Federación Internacional de Natación (FINA) (International Swimming Federation) and the approval of the Federación Puertorriqueña de Natación (FPN) (Puerto Rican Swimming Federation). Countries that have competed in the past include Bolivia, Colombia, Costa Rica, Dominican Republic, Ecuador, El Salvador, Guatemala, Honduras, Nicaragua, Panamá, Puerto Rico, United States, U.S. Virgin Islands and Venezuela. The competition originally included local Puerto Rican swimmers only, but after two years, it was opened to foreign nationals as well.

It is a common practice to dedicate the event to athletes who have made outstanding accomplishments in the sport. On 4 September 2011, the 30th annual competition was dedicated to Orlando Fernández, a.k.a. "The Puerto Rican Aquaman", the first Puerto Rican to swim across the Strait of Gibraltar, in recognition of his accomplishments.

Venue

The competition consists of crossing the Bay of Ponce from Cardona Island, which is situated about 1.5 nautical miles from mainland's Puerto Rico southern shores in Ponce, to the southern shore of Puerto Rico at Ponce. The entire event starts on the Thursday before the Sunday of the competitions with music, shows and traditional foods.  The Ponce Municipal Government contributes $20,000 to the costs of celebrating the event.

Procedure
Athletes are taken by boat to Isla Cardona which is located just 1.5 nautical miles from the mainland. At the sound of the whistle, athletes then swim the 2,800 meters - 1.5 nautical miles - across the bay towards sector El Malecón in Playa de Ponce.  Athletes arrive at Parque Enrique González in Playa de Ponce, which is located across from the U.S. Customs House and has an area with steps that lead down to the bay waters. The first athlete to arrive is the winner. First place, second place, and third place awards are given. The Mayor of Ponce awaits athletes at El Malecon's finish line to bestow medals, prizes and other awards on the winners.

Beyond the two main competitive divisions based on gender (Men's and Women's), the 2009 event consisted of two categories: "Categoria Abierta", open to those between ages 13 and 25; and "Categoria Masters", open to those over 26 years of age.  The 2011 edition also had the "Over 56+" category for those 56 years old and older.

Winners
As an added bonus and incentive to the first Puerto Rican who makes it to the finish line, in 2008 the municipality added the "Copa Héctor Pérez" (Spanish for Héctor Pérez Cup), which is given to the athlete with those qualities and merit. In 2008, it went to Nathaniel Ramos. Héctor Pérez Torres, born in Playa de Ponce, is a sportsman and community leader, and has been organizing the Cruce a Nado Internacional event.

2005 (25th Competition)
As reported by Panama's La Prensa, here is the list of winners.

Men's Division

2009 (29th Competition)
As reported by the La Regata: el Periodico Nautico de Puerto Rico newsweekly, here is the list of winners.

Men's Division

Women's Division

56+ Division

2010 (30th Competition)
As reported by "Agencia Venezolana de Noticias, Torre Lincoln, Piso 7, Sabana Grande, Caracas, Venezuela", here are the 2010 Men's and Women's winners.

Men's Division

Women's Division

2011 (31st Competition)
As reported by "El Sur a la Vista", here are the 2011 winners in each of the three divisions.

Men's Division

Women's Division

56+ Division

2012 (32nd Competition)
As reported by "La Perla del Sur", here are the 2012 winners.

Men's Division

2013 (33rd Competition)
As reported by La Perla del Sur newsweekly, here is the list of winners.

Men's Division

Women's Division

Puerto Rican Men's Swimmers awards

Puerto Rican Women's Swimmers awards

2014 (34th Competition)
As reported by La Perla del Sur newsweekly, here is the list of winners.

Men's Division

Women's Division

Puerto Rican Men's Swimmers awards

Puerto Rican Women's Swimmers awards

2015 (35th Competition)
As reported by DeportivAPP and Agenda56 here is the list of winners.

Men's Division

2016 (36th Competition)
As reported by DeportivAPP, here is the list of winners.

Men's Division

2017 (37th Competition)
As reported by 1968: Noticias de Natación de Venezuela y el Mundo, here is the list of winners.

Men's Division

Women's Division

2018 (38th Competition)
The 38th Competition is scheduled to take place on 2 September 2018.

2020
The 2020 edition did not take place due to the COVID-19 pandemic.

2021 (40th Competition)
The 40th Competition was scheduled to take place on 5 September 2021.

See also
 Las Justas
 Ponce Grand Prix de Atletismo
 Ponce Marathon
 Ponce Grand Prix
 Carnaval de Ponce
 Feria de Artesanías de Ponce
 Ponce Jazz Festival
 Fiesta Nacional de la Danza
 Día Mundial de Ponce
 Festival Nacional de la Quenepa
 Bienal de Arte de Ponce

References

External links
 See Video of Cruce al Nado HERE

September events
Annual events in Puerto Rico
Swimming competitions in North America
Recurring sporting events established in 1980
Entertainment events in Puerto Rico
Events in Ponce, Puerto Rico
Sports events in Ponce, Puerto Rico
International sports competitions hosted by Puerto Rico
Swimming in Puerto Rico
1980 establishments in Puerto Rico